Alison Patricia McCullough  is a speech and language therapist and the current head of the Northern Ireland office of the Royal College of Speech and Language Therapists. McCullough was appointed MBE for services to speech and language in the 2009 Birthday Honours. In March 2019 she was a joint winner of the 'Lifetime Commitment to the Third Sector' award from the Northern Ireland Chamber of Commerce.

Publications
2001. "Viability and Effectiveness of Teletherapy for Pre-School Children with Special Needs", ''International Journal of Language & Communication Disorders 36, 321–326.

References

Living people
British women academics
Speech and language pathologists
Year of birth missing (living people)